The Department of Cultural Affairs is a department working under the Government of Kerala. The department is formed to promote and preserve the culture and heritage of Kerala. Several cultural organisations are present under this department.

Activities

Cultural Affairs (A) Department 
 
 Papers relating to Kerala Kalamandalam, Kerala Sahitya Academy, Kera la Sangeetha Nataka Academy, Kerala Folklore Academy, Kerala Lalithakala Academy, Bharat Bhavan, Thulu Academy
 Audit Reports, L.A. interpellation, Subject Committee Report, Estimate Committee report, O. P. Etc.
 Issuing Awards such as Ezhuthachan puraskaram, Kathakali Puraskaram,P allavoor Appu Marar Puraskaram, Raja Ravivarma Puraskaram, Keraleeya Nritha Natya Puraskaram.
 Papers relating to Grant-in-aid to Jawahar Bala Bhavan in the State and allied matters.
 Grant-in-aid to memorials to eminent men of arts and letters and allied matters.
 Grant-in-aid to Cultural Organisations in the State and NRG to various Cultural Institutions.
 Papers relating to Kerala State Chalachitra Academy, Kerala State Film Development Corporation.
 Related papers with L.A., Apex Committee Meeting etc. and Miscellaneous papers.

Cultural Affairs (B) Department 
 
 Papers relating to Archaeology Department, Centre for Heritage Studies
 Papers relating to Administration and Establishment matters of Museum & Zoo
 Multi Purpose Cultural Complex Society (Vyloppilly Samskrithi Bhavan).
 Miscellaneous papers of Cultural Affairs (B) Department.
 Papers relating to South Zone Cultural Centre and Swathi Sangeetholsavam.
 Cinema-TV Awards, Cultural Exchange Programme, Monthly Plan Progress.
 Papers related to Budget proposals of Cultural Affairs Department, Subject Committee, Vasthuvidya Gurukulam and Cine Artists' Pension.
 Paper related to Subsidy for Malayalam film and grant to federation of film societies of India
 Sanctioning of grant for the conduct of International Film Festivel, Kerala

Cultural Affairs (C) Department 
 
 All papers relating to State Institute of Languages, Kerala State Institute of Children's Literature, State Institute of Encyclopaedic Publications, Kerala State Book Mark, Konkani Sahithya Academy, Kerala State Cultural Activists Welfare Fund Board.
 Pension papers of Kerala Government Cultural Institution Employees Pension Scheme.
 All papers of State Archives Department & Directorate of Culture 
 Monthly pension to artists who are in indigent circumstances, Arrear pension of pensioner to his/her heirs.
 Financial Assistance to Artists for Medical treatment, Central-state pension to artists.
 All miscellaneous papers relating to the Section.
 Consolidation work of Cultural Affairs Department.
 L. A. Interpellation.
 Monthly Business Statement.
 Papers related to classical language Status to Malayalam

Organisations under the department 

 Directorate of Culture
 Department of Archaeology
 Department of Archives
 Museum and Zoo Department
 Kerala Sahitya Akademi
 Kerala State Chalachitra Academy
 Kerala Sangeetha Nataka Akademi
 Kerala Lalithakala Akademi
 Kerala Folklore Academy
 Konkani Sahithya Academy
 Tulu Academy
 Mahakavi Moyinkutty Vaidyar Mappila Kala Academy
 Urdu Academy
 State Institute of Languages
 Kerala State Institute of Children's Literature
 State Institute of Encyclopaedic Publications
 Kerala State Book Mark
 Malayalam Mission
 Vyloppilly Samskrithi Bhavan
 Vasthuvidya Gurukulam
 Bharath Bhavan
 Guru Gopinath Natana Gramam
 Centre for Heritage Studies
 Sreenarayana International Study Centre
 Kumaran Asan National Institute of Culture
 Jawahar Bala Bhavan
 Kerala Kalamandalam
 Kerala State Film Development Corporation
 Kerala State Cultural Activists Welfare Fund Board
 Pallana Kumaranasan Smarakam
 O. V. Vijayan Smarakam
 Kunchan Nambiyar Smarakam Ampalapuzha
 Thakazhi Smarakam
 Kunjunnimash Smarakam
 Kunjan Nambiar Smarakam
 Vaikom Muhammad Basheer Smaraka Trust
 Govinda Pai Smaraka Samithy
 Parthi Subbah Yakshagana Samithi
 Narendraprasad  Smaraka Nadaka Padana Gaveshana Kendram
 Unnaiwarrier Smaraka Kala Nilayam
 Mayyanad C. Kesavan Smarakom
 Cherayi Sahodharan Ayyappan Smaraka Samithi
 Sarasakavi Mulur Smarakom
 A. R. Rajarajavarma Smaraka Samithi
 Thunchan Memorial Trust

See also 
 Department of Finance
 Department of Forests and Wildlife
 Department of Information and Public Relations
 Department of Non Resident Keralites Affairs
 Department of Public Works
 Department of Tourism
 Department of Revenue and Land Survey
 Department of Food and Civil Supplies
 Department of Industries
 Department of General and Higher Education

References

External links 
 

Government departments of Kerala
Culture of Kerala
Kerala